Derbyshire County Cricket Club in 2009 was the cricket season when the English club Derbyshire had been playing for one hundred and thirty-eight years. In the County Championship, they finished  sixth in the second division. In the Pro40 league, they finished seventh in the second division. They were eliminated at group level in the Friends Provident Trophy and came sixth in the North section of the Twenty20 Cup.

2009 season

Derbyshire was in Division 2 of the County Championship and finished in sixth position. Of their sixteen games, they won two and lost three, the remainder being drawn. Derbyshire was in Division 2 of the NatWest Pro40 League in which they  won two of their eight matches to finish seventh in the division. In the Friends Provident Trophy Derbyshire played in Group D, coming third in the table and not progressing. In the Twenty20 Cup, Derbyshire played in the North Division and won three of their ten matches to finish sixth in the division.

Chris Rogers was captain. He was also top scorer with six centuries. Tim Groenewald took most wickets overall.

Matches

First Class

NatWest Pro40 League

Friends Provident Trophy

Twenty20 Cup

Statistics

Competition batting averages

Competition bowling averages

Wicket Keeping
James Pipe 
County Championship  Catches  36, Stumping 2  
Twenty20 Catches 4, Stumping 2  
Thomas Poynton 
PRO40 Catches 3, Stumping 1  
Frederik Klokker 
County Championship Catches 3

See also
Derbyshire County Cricket Club seasons
2009 English cricket season

References

2009 in English cricket
Derbyshire County Cricket Club seasons